The earth pyramids of Platten (German: Erdpyramiden von Platten or Erdpyramiden bei Oberwielenbach) are earth pyramids located in Platten in the municipality of Percha, near Bruneck in South Tyrol, Italy.

The erosion area is located at an altitude of 1550 to 1750 meters. What is so impressive about the pyramids of Platten is their wildness which reminds at the same time also of their fragility.

The pyramids of Platten belong to the most beautiful natural monuments of South Tyrol such as the earth pyramids of Ritten and part of the earth pyramids of South Tyrol.

They were described in a scientific manner for the first time by Karl Meusburger in 1914 .

History
Following a cloudburst, a few centuries ago, there came a landslide which cut off the roads connecting the villages in the surroundings of Aschbach.

In 1882, again after a heavy cloudburst, a  new fault was formed. Following eluviations and erosions these earth
pyramids are constantly changing; that is due to the succession of severe cold spells in winter and hot summers which have the effect of continually forming new ones.

Getting There and Hiking Route

From the main road we deter at Percha/Percia and drive less than 6 km up into Oberwielenbach and beyond it a bit more to the big parking place. That road continues to the hamlet of Platten, but before reaching it, another narrow mountain road deters left, heading towards the Gönner Alm (alpine pasture). On the crossroads there's the inscription that this mountain road leads also towards the pyramids, but it is closed for public traffic (2017). So, it's best to start the walk up to the pyramids before, on the big parking place, 1430 m, or eventually later, from Platten.

From the big parking place, 1430 m, a good, marked path goes up into the woods. First it ascends a bit, then does a lot of crossing the slopes towards the right. When we reach out of the woods, hitting the before mentioned mountain road, we follow the road only to the big left turn. From there we go into the forest again and in a few minutes we reach the big ravine with the pyramids. Some 30 minutes till here.

To return, it is best to use the approach route, even if we descend along the ravine to the lower lookout point. From there a path goes further down, but it descends more than needed and makes the return a bit longer.

References

External links 

 http://www.atlasobscura.com/places/earth-pyramids-of-platten

Geography of South Tyrol
Erosion landforms